En Soap (A Soap or Soap) is a 2006 Danish melodramatic comedy film directed by Pernille Fischer Christensen which incorporates many of the austere techniques of Dogme style. The movie, starring Trine Dyrholm and David Dencik, follows the turbulent relationship between an abrasive beauty clinic owner and a depressed pre-op transgender woman. Made on a budget of 1.5 million dollars, it was the first feature film directed by Christensen.

Cast 
 Trine Dyrholm as Charlotte
 David Dencik as Veronica
  as Kristian
  as Veronica's Mother
 Christian Tafdrup as Costumer
  as Costumer
  as One-Night Stand
 Claes Bang as One-Night Stand
  as the Narrator (voice)

Reception 
The film received mixed reviews. Some critics dismissed it for low-budget productions values and depressing characters, while others praised it for the quirky performances and Christensen's inventive techniques. The film won critical praise at film festivals and earned Christensen both a Jury Grand Prix Silver Bear and the Best First Feature Film Award at the 2006 Berlin Film Festival. A Soap received the Bodil Award for the 2007 Danish Film of the Year. Dyrholm's leading role earned her a third Bodil Award for Best Actress in a Leading Role.

References

External links 
 
 
 
 

2006 comedy films
2006 films
2006 LGBT-related films
Danish comedy films
Danish LGBT-related films
2000s Danish-language films
Films about trans women
Films directed by Pernille Fischer Christensen
Silver Bear Grand Jury Prize winners
Best Danish Film Bodil Award winners